Vuleta is a surname. Notable people with the surname include:
 Franjo Vuleta (born 1968), Bosnian footballer
 Ivana Vuleta (born 1990), Serbian long jumper
 Stjepan Vuleta (born 1993), Swiss footballer

See also